Peter Hemmel of Andlau (c. 1420–1506) was a late Gothic stained glass artist, whose workshop in Strasbourg was active between 1447 and 1501. Sometimes working alone and sometimes in collaboration with other stained-glass artists in the city, it mainly supplied religious buildings in what is now Austria, southern and eastern Germany, eastern France and northern Italy, though none of Hemmel's windows survive in Andlau itself.

Hemmel was born in Andlau, now in the Bas-Rhin region of France, but became a citizen of Strasbourg as well as a landowner and counsellor. A document of 1466 refers to him marrying the widow of the painter Hans Hirtz. He died in Strasbourg.

Hemmel used templates drawing on the work of Rogier van der Weyden and Martin Schongauer. He used two-coloured and shaded glass in bright iron reds, bright blues, black-enamel and silver-yellow (produced with silver salts) to reproduce brocades, textiles and faces. He is also notable for his attention to details, such as in animals and plants, as seen in the Guilds Window in Ulm Minster.

Works
 Strasbourg Cathedral
 St William's Church, Strasbourg
 Sainte-Madeleine, Strasbourg, now in the Musée de l’Œuvre Notre-Dame
 The choir of Ulm Minster
 The Council Window, commissioned by the city council in 1480
 The Guilds Window, commissioned by the city guilds in 1480
 St. Lorenz, Nuremberg - the Volckamer Window, commissioned by Peter Volckamer in 1480
 St. George's Collegiate Church, Tubingen - the window in the choir, 1475
 Augsburg Cathedral
 Frauenkirche, Munich
 Stiftskirche Nonnberg, Salzburg
 Freiburger Münster
 Metz Cathedral
 Milan Cathedral (several windows)
 Lady chapel in Notre-Dame-de-la-Nativité, Saverne
 Mariä Krönung, pilgrimage church in Lautenbach

References

External links

Bibliography 
  Hermann Baumhauer, Joachim Feist: Das Ulmer Münster und seine Kunstwerke, Konrad Theiss Verlag, Stuttgart und Aalen 1977, 
  Erhard John: Die Glasmalereien im Ulmer Münster, Langenau 1999, 
  Lawrence Lee; George Seddon; Francis Stephens: Die Welt der Glasfenster - Zwölf Jahrhunderte abendländischer Glasmalerei in über 500 Farbbildern, Farbbilder von: Sonia Halliday, Laura Lushington, Orbis Verlag, München 1992, 
  Wolfgang Lipp: Begleiter durch das Ulmer Münster, Langenau 1999, 
  Heinz Merten: Andlau, Peter von. In: Neue Deutsche Biographie (NDB). Band 1, Duncker & Humblot, Berlin 1953, S. 270–272
  ADAC-Reiseführer: Elsass von 2005

1420 births
1506 deaths
French stained glass artists and manufacturers
People from Bas-Rhin